Saeed Uz Zaman Siddiqui (1 December 1939 – 11 January 2017) (pronunciation 'sa'eed -uz- zam'an'; alternatively Saiduzzaman Siddiqui) was a Pakistani jurist and legislator of great prominence who formerly served as the 15th Chief Justice of Pakistan and, prior to that, the 7th Chief Justice of the Sindh High Court. At the time of his death, he was serving as the 28th Governor of Sindh.

Education
Saeeduzzaman Siddiqui was born in a middle-class, educated Urdu-speaking family and received his school education at Lucknow (in modern Uttar Pradesh) and also was educated at Calcutta. Justice Siddiqui passed Matriculation from the Board of Secondary Education from Dhaka, East Pakistan in 1952. In 1954, Justice Siddiqui obtained intermediate in Engineering sciences from the University of Dacca. Siddiqui worked at the Physics Department, and taught undergraduate physics laboratory courses. Thereafter, Siddiqui moved to Karachi, West-Pakistan and attended Karachi University in 1954. There, at Karachi University, Siddiqui obtained B.A. in Philosophy and L.L.B from the University of Karachi in 1958. In 1960, Justice Siddiqui started legal practice at the Sindh High Court.

Justice Siddiqui was awarded honorary membership of the Judicial fraternity of Australia and Canada after the news of his resignation from the office of the Chief Justice was made public in January 2000, after his refusal to take the Oath under the PCO (Provisional Constitutional Order), which was an extra-constitutionally prescribed Oath for the Judges by the military regime of Pervez Musharraf. Saeeduzzaman Siddiqui received a letter of commendation from the Judiciary of the United Kingdom and was inducted in the roles of Judges of eminence by the British Judiciary for his stand in the cause of the independence of Pakistan's Judiciary, his stand was later glorified by the lawyers movement in Pakistan which helped Chief Justice Iftikhar Chaudhary's restoration.

Career

Joining the Bar and Sindh High Court 
Justice Saeeduzzaman joined the Bar in February 1961. He enrolled as Advocate of High Court of West Pakistan in November 1963, and enrolled as Advocate of Supreme Court of Pakistan in November 1969). He was elected Joint Secretary of Karachi High Court Bar Association in 1967. He was elected Member of Managing Committee of Karachi High Court Bar Association for the year 1968–69. In 1977, he was elected Honorary Secretary of High Court Bar Library and continued as such until begin elevated as a Judge of Sindh High Court on 5 May 1980. He was appointed Chief Justice of the Sindh High Court on 5 November 1990 and as Judge of Supreme Court of Pakistan on 23 May 1992.

Chief Justice of Pakistan 
He was appointed the Chief Justice of Pakistan/Chairman Pakistan Law Commission w.e.f. 1 July 1999 till 1 December 2005. He was the Chief Justice of Pakistan when the 1999 military coup d'état was staged by then-Chairman of the Joint Chiefs of Staff Committee and Chief of Army Staff General Pervez Musharraf. Notably, he defied the request given by Musharraf via the Law Minister and Legal Adviser Sharifuddin Pirzada to take a new oath under the Provisional Constitutional Order (PCO) saying that: "Taking an oath under the PCO, in my opinion, will be a deviation from the oath I had taken to defend the constitution of 1973". The PCO not only negated the independence of the judiciary and democratic norms, but also prolonged the martial law by nullifying the effect of any judgement given against President Pervez Musharraf's government.

Post-retirement 
As a consequence of this, he was forced to step down from his position by the military regime. His tenure time period was shortened due to his refusal to take the Provisional Constitutional Order (PCO) Oath, prescribed by General Pervez Musharraf to legitimize the Legal Framework Order, 2002. After a long discussion with the four Army generals sent to his residence by General Musharraf; namely, Lieutenant-General (Retired) Moinuddin Haider, who was Interior Minister, then-Lieutenant-General Ehsan ul Haq, Core-commander of the XI Corps, Lieutenant-General (retired) Mahmud Ahmed, then-Director General of the ISI and Brigadier-General (retired) Javed Ashraf Bajwa; Chief Justice Siddiqui refused to take the Oath after which the Generals left. On the orders of GHQ he, along with his family were put into house arrest.

On 25 August 2008, Nawaz Sharif announced that Saeeduzzaman Siddiqui would be Pakistan Muslim League (N) and Jamaat-e-Islami nominee to replace Pervez Musharraf as President of Pakistan. He lost the 6 September 2008 Pakistani presidential election, by 153 votes to Asif Ali Zardari, who was elected President of Pakistan. The PML-N although in power wanted Siddiqui as a unanimous candidate as he was the only nonpartisan candidate contesting this election of 2008. Justice Siddiqui was again selected for running as the candidate in the 2013 Pakistani presidential election, but at the last moment his name was replaced by Mamnoon Hussain as Siddiqui never joined the PML-N and was a neutral candidate. He was supported by Baloch nationalists.

Governor of Sindh 
On 9 November 2016, Nawaz Sharif contacted Justice Siddiqui and asked him to accept the position of the Governor, in the wake of event which followed the dismissal of Dr. Ishratul Ibad Khan. Justice Siddiqui was sworn in as the 31st Governor of Sindh on 11 November 2016. He died in office exactly two months later.

Appointments

 Appointed Member of Election Commission of Pakistan on 9 August 1980.
 Appointed as Chairman Rule Committee of High Court of Sindh on 1 February 1986.
 Appointed Chairman Sindh Zakat Council on 13 September 1988.
 Appointed as Member of Company Law Commission on 7 June 1989.
 Appointed Acting Governor of Sindh from 27 July 1990 to 30 July 1990.
 Appointed Acting Chief Justice of High Court of Sindh from 19 September 1990 to 19 October 1990.
 Appointed as 15th Chief Justice of Pakistan from 1 July 1999 to 25 January 2000 was until December 2005
 Appointed Chairman of Citizens' Group on Electoral Process (CGEP)
 Member OIC contact group, also submitted a report on 'Bulgarian Muslims Social condition'
 Appointed as Governor of Sindh on 9 November 2016

Activities

 Appointed as Member of 3-men Contact Group, by Secretary-General of the Organization of Islamic Conference to investigate the plight of Muslim minority in Bulgaria in May 1986. He presented the first report of the group to the 17th Islamic Conference of Foreign Ministers held at Amman, Jordan, in March 1988, a second report to the 18th Islamic Conference of Foreign Ministers at Riyadh in March 1989, and the third report to the 19th Islamic Conference of Foreign Ministers at Cairo in July 1990.
 Also presented a preliminary report on the plight of Muslim minority in Bulgaria in the Extraordinary Session of Islamic Conference of Foreign Ministers in New York in October 1989. Attended the 17th, 18th, 19th and the Extraordinary Session of Islamic Conferences of Foreign Ministers in Amman, Riyadh, Cairo and New York on special invitation of Secretary-General of Organization of Islamic Conference.
 He was the Chairman of numerous organizations, some of which are The Council for Foreign Relations Economic Affairs and Law and President of the Poor Patient's Society of Pakistan. He was the Chairman of the World Bank supported Organization for Alternative Dispute Resolution (Pakistan).
 He was also the nominee judge for the International Court of Justice (ICJ) at The Hague, from Pakistan.
 On 25 August 2008, Nawaz Sharif announced that Justice Siddiqui would be Pakistan Muslim League (N) and Jamaat-i-Islami's joint candidate to replace Pervez Musharraf as President of Pakistan, he also received popular support from the Baloch Nationalist parties, although he had never joined any political party even after being approached by Pakistan Tehreek-e-Insaf Chairman Imran Khan in 2007 and again in 2010. He chose to remain a nonpartisan individual. His name has been suggested by JUI and Pakistan Tehreek-i-Insaf for the Prime Minister candidate when the interim government comes into power after March 2013.
 On 9 November 2016, Mamnoon Hussain in consultation with Nawaz Sharif appointed him as the Governor of Sindh province.

Hus incompetency was evident in case of Mai Jindo case, where Judge Siddiqui came out to be partisan and gave favor to culprit Major Arshad, who was accused of killing 9 innocent people. Upon his partisanship, two more lives were Lost.

Illness and death
Siddiqui contracted pneumonia  and was hospitalised in early November 2016. He returned to the Governor House on 11 December 2016 and died on 11 January 2017 as a serving Governor when he contracted another pneumonia on his healthy right lung. His state funeral was organised in the Governor House, making him the second person in the history of the country to receive a state funeral after Muhammad Ali Jinnah, the founder of Pakistan. He was 77.

In 2018, Siddiqui was posthumously awarded the Sitara-i-Imtiaz - Pakistan's third highest civilian honour - by President Mamnoon Hussain.

Siblings 
He had 4 brothers and 4 sisters named

Brothers 
1) Qamar uzzaman Siddique

2) Badr uzzaman Siddique

3) Khaliq uzzaman Siddique

4) Anees uzzaman Siddique

Sisters 
1) Mehr-un-nisa

2) Tahira Mehmood

3) Surraya Iqbal

4) Kausar Waseem

See also
 Supreme Court of Pakistan
 Chief Justices of Pakistan
 Haziqul Khairi
 Siddiqui
 Nawaz Sharif
 Pakistan Muslim League (N)
 Provisional Constitutional Order
 List of Pakistanis

References 

|-

1939 births
2017 deaths
Muhajir people
Governors of Sindh
Candidates for President of Pakistan
Chief justices of Pakistan
Pakistani activists
Chief Justices of the Sindh High Court
Pakistani scholars
Politicians from Karachi
University of Karachi alumni
Sindh Muslim Law College alumni
Lawyers from Karachi
Recipients of Sitara-i-Imtiaz